The men's 50 metre pistol was a shooting sports event held as part of the Shooting at the 1936 Summer Olympics programme. It was the sixth appearance of the event. The competition was held on 6 and 7 August 1936 at the shooting ranges at Wannsee. 43 shooters from 19 nations competed. Nations were limited to three shooters each, as they had been for all individual shooting events since the 1932 Games. The event was won by Torsten Ullman of Sweden, the nation's first free pistol medal. Erich Krempel of Germany took silver (that nation's first medal in the event as well). Charles des Jammonières's bronze was France's first medal in the free pistol since 1900.

Background 

This was the sixth appearance of what would become standardised as the men's ISSF 50 meter pistol event. The event was held at every Summer Olympics from 1896 to 1920 (except 1904, when no shooting events were held) and from 1936 to 2016; it was nominally open to women from 1968 to 1980, although very few women participated these years. 1896 and 1908 were the only Games in which the distance was not 50 metres; the former used 30 metres and the latter 50 yards.

The two-time reigning (1933 and 1935) world champion was Torsten Ullman of Sweden. France's Charles des Jammonières was the runner-up in 1933; Germany's Erich Krempel had finished second in 1935.

Argentina, Czechoslovakia, Italy, Monaco, the Philippines, Portugal, and Romania each made their debut in the event. Greece and the United States each made their fifth appearance, tied for most of any nation.

Ullman used an Udo Anschütz Record 210.

Competition format 

The competition had each shooter fire 60 shots, in 10 series of 6 shots each, at a distance of 50 metres. The target was round, 50 centimetres in diameter, with 10 scoring rings. Scoring for each shot was up to 10 points, in increments of 1 point. The maximum score possible was 600 points. Any pistol was permitted. "Glasses" could not be attached. The time limit for the full 60 shots was two hours. Ties were broken first by hits, then by bulls-eyes (7s and above), then by 10s, then by 9s, etc., then by closest to center of the last shot.

Records 

Prior to this competition, the existing world and Olympic records were as follows.

The top 33 shooters broke the 36-year-old Olympic record, with the 34th tying it. Erich Krempel held the new Olympic record at the end of the first day, but Torsten Ullman had not shot yet. Ullman competed on the second day, breaking the world record by 12 points.

Schedule 

On 6 August, the shooters from Argentina, Chile, Italy, Norway, Portugal, Romania, Czechoslovakia, Hungary, USA, and Germany started. On the following day the shooters of all other countries competed. The competition started on both days at 8 a.m.

On the first day it was dry with fairly overcast sky. The wind influenced the competition at times during the morning. On the second day it was sunny in the morning and fairly overcast in the afternoon. In general the weather was warmer and there was no wind.

Results

References

External links 
Official Report Part II
 

Shooting at the 1936 Summer Olympics
Men's 1936